Instinction may refer to:

 Instinction (song), a 1982 single by Spandau Ballet
 Instinction (video game), an upcoming video game scheduled for 2022